Halbeath railway station served the village of Halbeath, Fife, Scotland, from 1851 to 1930 on the Dunfermline Branch.

History 
The station was opened in July 1851 by the Edinburgh and Northern Railway. To the east of the level crossing was the goods yard and the signal box and on the eastbound platform was the station building. To the north was Halbeath Colliery, which was accessed by the Halbeath Waggonway to the east. The station closed on 1 January 1917 but it reopened on 1 June 1919, before closing permanently on 22 September 1930.

References 

Disused railway stations in Fife
Railway stations in Great Britain opened in 1851
Railway stations in Great Britain closed in 1930
1851 establishments in Scotland
1930 disestablishments in Scotland